LVSD may refer to:

 Left Ventricular end-systolic Dimension; see Ventricle (heart)#Dimensions
 Left ventricular systolic dysfunction; see Heart failure#Systolic dysfunction
 Ligonier Valley School District in Westmoreland County, Pennsylvania